Cyril Nathaniel "Spider" Haynes (born 1915 in the Panama Canal Zone; died 1996) was an American jazz pianist and arranger.

Haynes was raised in New York City and studied at Columbia University. He played in the band for the vaudeville show Dixie on Parade, then played with Billy Hicks in 1937 and worked as a pianist and arranger with Al Cooper's Savoy Sultans in New York's Savoy Ballroom in 1940/41. In 1943, he married Rosamond Yarborough. He was a member of the orchestra of Sidney and Wilbur De Paris. From the end of 1943 he played with Roy Eldridge, then in the trio of Cedric Wallace and with Frankie Newton, George James, and Barney Bigard. In 1945 he recorded under own name for the Label Comet; His co-players included Dick Vance, Don Byas, Al Casey, John Levy, and Harold "Doc" West. In the same year he played with a quartet of Budd Johnson, Denzil Best, and Johnny Williams, for a recording on Black & White Records ("So Tired"/"Solitude").

In Hollywood he worked with Slim Gaillard in 1947, then with Benny Carter. In 1949 he performed with his own trio at the Village Vanguard; in 1952 he played with Ben Webster, Ray Brown and Milt Jackson. In the 1950s he also worked with Noble Sissle and Andy Kirk, and played for several years with Cab Calloway. 

He also traveled with Cab Calloway while performing for the halftime shows with the Harlem Globettotters Haynes had a son in July 1953. He continued to record until 1961, and in the middle of the 1970s he performed as a soloist in New York clubs such as The Cookery, The Embers, The Cotton Club and Jimmy.

Haynes worked for various artist at the Apollo Theater in NYC. He worked wit names such as Billie Holiday, Lena Horne, Diana Washington, Peg Leg Bates, Moms Mabelly. He published two albums entitled Spider Plays and the Spider Weaves Piano Magic. On the second album the second song Rosamond was written for his wife. Haynes was a member of Musicians Union Local 802 and also a members of ASCAP. Haynes died in the blizzard of January 1996, from a massive heart attack while working on his front door.

References

American jazz pianists
American male pianists
1915 births
1996 deaths
20th-century American male musicians
American male jazz musicians
20th-century American pianists
Savoy Sultans members
Zonians